Pay Your Dues is a 1919 American short comedy film featuring Harold Lloyd.

Plot
A chapter of the Ancient Order of Simps lodge is initiating three new members who each must undergo a rough hazing.  All three candidates are blindfolded.  Just before the third man is supposed to go through his initiation ritual, he takes advantage of his guard (Snub Pollard) dozing off.  He lifts his blindfold and, through a keyhole of a locked door, observes the second candidate, a tiny man, being thoroughly abused.  Unwilling to endure such an ordeal, the third man decides to escape through a window.  Still wearing a blindfold, he is hotly pursued by the lodge's members.  The fleeing man runs through a park where The Boy (Harold Lloyd) has been enjoying the female company of Bebe and about a dozen of her friends.  When the man encounters The Boy, by a remarkable coincidence, The Boy is also blindfolded as part of a game. The pursuing lodge members mistake The Boy for the escaped candidate and forcibly haul him back to the lodge for "his" initiation rites.  With the aid of trickery, The Boy, blindfolded, is made to think he is climbing a tall building, walking on a ledge, and being attacked by a vicious dog.  Bebe and her friends attempt to rescue The Boy, but by the time they arrive at the lodge and overpower Snub, The Boy has successfully endured his initiation ordeal and happily joins the Ancient Order of Simps.

Cast
 Harold Lloyd as The Boy
 Snub Pollard 
 Bebe Daniels  
 Sammy Brooks
 Lige Conley (as Lige Cromley)
 Frank Daniels
 William Gillespie
 Charles Inslee
 Mark Jones
 Dee Lampton
 Gus Leonard
 Earl Mohan
 Marie Mosquini
 Fred C. Newmeyer (as Fred C. Newmeyer)
 H.L. O'Connor
 Robert Emmett O'Connor
 Charles Stevenson (as Charles E. Stevenson)
 Chase Thorne
 Noah Young

See also
 Harold Lloyd filmography

External links

1919 films
1919 comedy films
1919 short films
Silent American comedy films
American silent short films
American black-and-white films
Films directed by Hal Roach
Films with screenplays by H. M. Walker
American comedy short films
1910s American films